It's the Law (Italian for "daylight saving time") is a 2017 Italian comedy film, directed and starred by Ficarra e Picone.

Plot
In Pietrammare, a Sicilian town, a new mayor is to be elected. The candidates are the former mayor, a mafia puppet hated by the community, and a mild professor, who wants to finally bring honesty to the country. The latter candidate wins the election, and, with the help of his relatives Salvatore and Valentino, begins to implement his program of legality. Unfortunately this program of "civilisation" only exasperates all the citizens, with fines being charged for various infractions and taxes being increased. Eventually, this also involves Salvo and Valentino, who see their bar being closed because the kiosk was abusive. For this reason, the couple organizes a plan to defame the mayor, in order to start up a parliamentary inquiry, forcing the mayor to resign.

Reception

The film being acclaimed by Italian critics.

References

External links

2017 films
Italian comedy films
Films set in Sicily
Films directed by Ficarra e Picone
2010s Italian films

2017 comedy films